Hooked on a Feeling is the ninth studio album by American actor and singer David Hasselhoff, released on November 11, 1997, by Polydor Records. On the album, Hasselhoff collaborated again with Mark Holden, who worked with him since 1993, as well as new writers and producers, including Wade Hubbard, Gary St. Clair and John Ballard. On the album, Hasselhoff also collaborated in the songwriting on several tracks, and featured collaborations with Regine Velasquez, Marilyn Martin and Gwen. The album became Hasselhoff's lowest selling album to that point in his career, failing to chart in Germany, and reaching the top-fifty in Austria and Switzerland.

Background and release 
Following the release of Du (1994) and his departure from Ariola Records and BMG Music, Hasselhoff signed with Polydor Records and began recordings for a new album. The album includes collaborations with several recording artists, including Filipino singer Regine Velasquez, American singer Marilyn Martin and German singer Gwen, who previously appeared on the track "Wir zwei allein" from the album You Are Everything (1993).

Hooked on a Feeling was released on November 11, 1997, by Polydor, and became his only album released with the label, before they dropping him for its roster. He would not release another studio album until 2004, with David Hasselhoff Sings America. The album was re-released that year under the title of More Than Words Can Say only in Indonesia, which includes the same tracklist but in different order, and excluding the main version of "Hooked on a Feeling" (as only the Radio Mix was included there).

Promotion 
Hasselhoff embarked on a short promotional tour for the album in Europe. He performed "Hooked on a Feeling" at Hitparade (Germany) on November 22, 1997, and at Takito (Switzerland) on December 4, 1997.

Singles 
The album's title track was released as the lead single, peaking at number 36 in Austria. The next two singles, "Hold on My Love" and "More Than Words Can Say" (featuring Regine Velasquez) failed to chart.

Commercial performance 
Hooked on a Feeling was commercially unsuccessful in comparison with his previous releases, as the album became Hasselhoff's first studio album that failed to chart in Germany. In Austria, the album debuted at its peak of number 49 on the Austrian Albums chart, spending only one week before leaving the chart, becoming Hasselhoff's least successful album and his lowest selling album to that point in Austria. In Switzerland, the album performed slightly better, debuting at its peak of number 41 (which also matched the same peak of his previous album Du), and spending four weeks on the chart.

Track listing

Charts

References 

1997 albums
David Hasselhoff albums
Polydor Records albums